Amadiya District is a district of Duhok Governorate in Kurdistan Region, Iraq. The administrative centre is Amadiya.

Subdistricts
The district has the following sub-districts:
Amadiya
Bamarni
Chamanke
Deraluk
Kani Masi
Sarsing

References

Districts of Dohuk Province
Geography of Iraqi Kurdistan
Amadiya